Pietro Dalle Vedove (or Delle Vedove in other sources; born August 19, 1903 in Cremona) was an Italian professional football player.

He played 6 games in the Serie A in the 1929/30 season for A.S. Roma.

1903 births
Year of death missing
Italian footballers
Serie A players
U.S. Cremonese players
A.S. Roma players
Association football midfielders
A.S.D. Fanfulla players